Hathakauli is an Indian village, which lies just next to Baldeo on the road joining to Agra from Baldeo en route Khandauli. Hathakauli has been notified by the Government of Uttar Pradesh as one of the area under Taj Expressway Industrial Development Authority to be developed as an industrial area in upcoming years. The village is situated at ~130 km mark on newly constructed 6 lane Yamuna Expressway (previously called as Taj Expressway) (Noida to Agra) and about 2.0 km from Baldeo, the city of Lord Balaram, the elder brother of Krishna.

Jat Gotras 
 Sikarwar
 Ghataina
 Bharangar
 Raiya
The village is one of the twelve villages of Sikarwar Gotra in district Mathura. Sikarwars are the majority; however, there are also Bharangar, Raiya and Ghataina Gotra in the village.

History and Leadership 
The village Hathakauli is famous for extensive ptato crop production in Mathura. The other crops being cultivated are wheat, pulses, cotton and forage. The village has several education institutions (schools) up to 12th standard, a water over head tank, a veterinary hospital, and two huge cold storage for potato farming. The majority of the villagers are Jats, while the others include Scheduled Caste (SC) and Scheduled Tribe (ST) people.

Mahashay Biri Singh, Shri Kharag Singh, Shri Komal Singh and others were famous freedom fighters in British Ruled India during Indian Independence Movement and endured several jail terms towards fighting for Independence of our country. Shri Kharag Singh was elected as the first Gram Pradhan (Head of the Village) in post-independent India. Shri Jagan Singh, Shri Jaybeer Singh, Shri Banbari Lal, Tej Singh, Shyambeer Singh, Smt. Rajani Devi, Vijendra Singh and Seema Devi have been the elected Gram Pradhan of Hathakauli in previous years. 

A youngster independent journalist Jaypal Sikarwar  who had Chief Editor/owned of 'Satyarth Prahar' (newspaper) also famous for his achievements and social service.

Many Jat inhabitants of the village are serving in Indian Defense (Indian Army, Indian Navy and Indian Air Force), various central/state government offices, educationist (teachers), scientists, journalists, various companies and in management / computer services.

Monuments 
Shri Shri 1008 Tede Mede Baba (टेढे मेढे बाबा - a pious saint) is supposed to be the most respectable icon and is worshiped throughout the village for prosperity and success.

Notable Persons 
◾Shri Nihal Singh, Retired Senior Defence Personnel, Kanpur

◾Shri Ram Veer Singh, Australia

◾Dr. Shyam Veer Singh, Senior Physician, Kanpur

▪Banbari Lal Sikarwar, Ex-Block Pramukh, Baldeo

References

Villages in Mathura district